Archibald Johnston McPherson (10 February 1909 – 1969) was a Scottish footballer who played as an inside left or left half, with his longest spell being with Liverpool. He was later a manager, in charge of Alloa Athletic for a decade.

Career
McPherson, known as 'Curly', began his professional career with Rangers before moving south of the border to join Liverpool in late 1929 after 18 months at Ibrox, in which he was loaned to East Stirlingshire then had a role as back-up to Bob McPhail, deciding to leave as he was unlikely to displace the Scottish international despite impressing when he did fill in while McPhail was injured. He was to be a regular in Liverpool's first-team for the next five years, playing as an inside-left and forming a partnership with Fred Hopkin.

Described as a skilful player and an accurate passer, in December 1934 he moved on to Sheffield United, where he was employed as a wing-half. He featured on the losing side in the 1936 FA Cup Final, before returning to Scotland to spend one year at Falkirk then short spells at East Fife and Dundee United up to the outbreak of World War II, after which he retired. He later managed Alloa Athletic for ten years, until a short time before his death in 1969.

He also played cricket, as a batsman, for Clackmannan County in the Scottish Counties Championship.

Honours
Rangers
Glasgow Cup: 1929–30

Alloa Athletic
Stirlingshire Cup: 1959–60, 1965–66

References

External links
Profile at LFCHistory.net

1909 births
1969 deaths
Scottish footballers
Rangers F.C. players
East Stirlingshire F.C. players
Liverpool F.C. players
Sheffield United F.C. players
Falkirk F.C. players
Scottish football managers
Alloa Athletic F.C. managers
East Fife F.C. players
Dundee United F.C. players
Association football inside forwards
Association football wing halves
Footballers from Stirling (council area)
English Football League players
Scottish Junior Football Association players
Scottish Football League players
Scottish Football League managers
FA Cup Final players